Halat Nuaim-Seltah is a Bahraini island. It is located off the coast of Muharraq island, near the town of Hidd.

History
There were two islands separated by a 100 meters channel between them.
Halat Nuaim which was inhabited by the Al Nuaim tribe, after whom it was named.
Halat Seltah which was inhabited by the Al Sulaiti tribe, whom the island is named after. 
At 1998, dredging began in the canal, to create an artificial land and connect the islands.

Demography

There are two villages located on the Island:
 Nuaim
 Seltah

Administration
The island belongs to Muharraq Governorate .

Transportation
The island is today connected to Muharraq Island by a road.

Economics
The inhabitants on the island are engaged in very small scale fishing which are mainly for the island consumption.

Image gallery

References 

Populated places in the Muharraq Governorate
Islands of Bahrain
Artificial islands of Bahrain
Islands of the Persian Gulf